The Brendan Courtney Show is an Irish weekly chat show hosted by Brendan Courtney.  It was first broadcast on TV3 on 9 November 2005 and aired for one series until 15 February 2006.

The Brendan Courtney Show featured guest interviews and live music from guest music groups and was aimed at a younger audience than its main rivals on RTÉ.  The show also contained pranks on an unsuspecting public and was noted for its Graham Norton-like audience participation.

The UK's Celebrity Big Brother winner Chantelle Houghton gave her first Irish interview to The Brendan Courtney Show in February 2006.

References

2005 Irish television series debuts
2006 Irish television series endings
Irish LGBT-related television shows
Irish television talk shows
Virgin Media Television (Ireland) original programming